VTC may refer to:

Academia
 Vehicular Technology Conference
 Vermont Technical College, US
 Virginia Tech Carilion School of Medicine and Research Institute, US
 Vocational Training Council, Hong Kong

Other
 Vacaville Transportation Center, California, a bus station 
 Vertcoin, a cryptocurrency
 Vesicular-tubular cluster, an organelle in eukaryotic cells 
 Veterans Transition Center, California, US
 Video teleconferencing, see videotelephony
 Vietnam Television Corporation
 Virginia Transformer Corporation
 Visual terminal chart, another name for terminal area chart (especially in Australia).
 Volunteer Training Corps (1914–1918), UK